The Cuero Commercial Historic District in Cuero, Texas is a  historic district that was listed on the National Register of Historic Places in 1988.  It includes multiple works of architect Jules Leffland.  The listing included 59 contributing buildings.

See also

National Register of Historic Places listings in DeWitt County, Texas

References

External links

Commercial buildings on the National Register of Historic Places in Texas
Romanesque Revival architecture in Texas
Renaissance Revival architecture in Texas
Neoclassical architecture in Texas
DeWitt County, Texas
Historic districts on the National Register of Historic Places in Texas
National Register of Historic Places in DeWitt County, Texas